Josep Pallach i Carolà (Figueres (Catalonia, Spain) 1920, l'Hospitalet de Llobregat (Catalonia, Spain), 1977) was a Catalan socialist leader. Libertarian communist during his youth, he fought with the Republic and was a leader of several anti-francoist movements.

1977 deaths
1920 births
Anarcho-communists
Anarchists from Catalonia
Politicians from Catalonia
POUM politicians
Spanish communists